Anno Dracula is a 1992 novel by British writer Kim Newman, the first in the Anno Dracula series. It is an alternate history using 19th-century English historical settings and personalities, along with characters from popular fiction.

Plot summary
The interplay between humans who have chosen to "turn" into vampires and those who are "warm" (humans) is the backdrop for the plot which tracks Jack the Ripper's politically charged destruction of vampire prostitutes. The reader is alternately and sympathetically introduced to various points of view. The main characters are Jack the Ripper, and his hunters Charles Beauregard (an agent of the Diogenes Club), and Geneviève Dieudonné, an elder French vampire (a similar version of Dieudonné appeared in Newman's trilogy of novels, written under the pseudonym Jack Yeovil, for the Warhammer Fantasy universe).

Synopsis 
The novel deviates from the events of Bram Stoker's Dracula. In this world, Vlad Tepes killed Abraham Van Helsing, and an injury sustained to Dr. John Seward's hand during a fight with Renfield resulted in Van Helsing's allies lacking the strength to defeat Dracula at the crucial moment. Instead, Dracula killed Quincey Morris and Jonathan Harker and completed Mina Harker's turning into vampire. With no one to oppose him, Dracula creates thousands of British vampires, marries and turns Queen Victoria (acquiring official royal status as Prince Consort) and ushers in a period of increasing British vampire domination. Dracula is well advanced in imposing a police state in the United Kingdom, where dissenters may be jailed or impaled without trial. Many of the country's leading scientists and intellectuals who choose to stay "warm" (including Sherlock Holmes) are imprisoned in concentration camps in the rural counties. The only two survivors of Van Helsing's group are Seward, who now runs a free clinic in Whitechapel, and Arthur Holmwood, Lord Godalming, who chose to become a vampire and is being groomed as a protégé by the new Prime Minister, Lord Ruthven.

Dieudonné has come down in the world, attending sick vampires in Seward's clinic. When another prostitute is murdered, Scotland Yard's Inspector Lestrade turns to them for an opinion. Beauregard, an agent of the Diogenes Club, is tasked with hunting down the killer, dubbed "Silver Knife" by the public, until an anonymous letter is delivered identifying him as "Jack the Ripper". The victim's inquest is attended by Lestrade, Dieudonné, and Beauregard, along with Captain Kostaki (an officer in Dracula's Carpathian Guard), and Dr. Henry Jekyll. Each sets out independently, with differing agendas. Separately, Lord Godalming is also tasked by Lord Ruthven with heading an unofficial investigation to catch the killer.

Beauregard is abducted by an old enemy, a Tong leader who calls a truce on the understanding that the London underworld also has a strong interest in Silver Knife's capture. His official duties also open a rift between him and his fiancée, Penelope Churchward (a cousin of his deceased first wife). In her zeal for social climbing, Penny also urges Beauregard to agree that both of them will become vampires after their marriage.

Jack the Ripper strikes twice, failing to destroy one of his victims, Elizabeth Stride, who is brought to the clinic. Attempting to heal her wounds by shapeshifting, Stride does it imperfectly, lunging at Seward in her agony before dying. The implication is lost on Dieudonné and Beauregard, none of whom know that Seward, driven insane with grief over the loss of his love, Lucy Westenra, has taken to hunting vampires on his own. His murderous activities abate, temporarily, when he becomes infatuated with another prostitute, Mary Jane Kelly, who greatly resembles Lucy.

During a temporary lull in the killings, Beauregard and Dieudonné, having similar ideas, become closer, while Penny is increasingly annoyed at Beauregard's lack of attention. In her haste, she allows Godalming to turn her, but the transformation is imperfect, and Penny almost dies, before being nursed back to health by Beauregard with Dieudonné's help. Repulsed by the creature Penny has become, Beauregard ends their engagement and he and Dieudonné become lovers.

Public unrest escalates, with unclear causes. An anti-vampire leader is shot, and another of the Carpathian Guard is blown up with dynamite, both perhaps by the same mysterious vampire. Captain Kostaki and Scotland Yard Inspector Mackenzie form an unlikely alliance to find the culprit, but the mysterious vampire ambushes them, killing Mackenzie and disabling Kostaki with a silver bullet to his knee.  Framed for Mackenzie's murder, Kostaki is imprisoned in the Tower of London, under the control of Graf Orlok. Lord Godalming questions Kostaki in secret, believing he has identified the Ripper as Sergeant Dravot, a vampire agent of the Diogenes Club.  Eager to claim the credit for himself, Godalming leaves Kostaki to be condemned for Mackenzie's death. While following Dravot, alone, Godalming is aggravated by a "chance" meeting with his old friend, Seward, not realizing until too late that Seward is the real Ripper, who believes Godalming betrayed him and Lucy by becoming a vampire.

Beauregard and Dieudonné both realize that Seward is the Ripper. They race to Whitechapel and apprehend him, but not before he has killed both Kelly and Godalming. They leave the murder scene with Seward in custody, but then encounter Dravot, who admits to acting on the Diogenes Club's orders. These orders required him to kill Mackenzie, foment the riots, and stand by as Seward butchered Mary Jane Kelly. These orders also require there to be, officially, two Rippers: Seward and Godalming were working together before they fell out and Seward killed the other. Beauregard and Dieudonné are equally disgusted. When Seward points out that Dracula will turn him into a vampire so he can be tortured for all eternity, Beauregard kills him out of mercy.

When Beauregard confronts his superiors at the Diogenes Club, he asks why he was assigned to the case at all, since Dravot did all the actual work. He is told that Dravot, a vampire, could not be given the official credit for solving the murders, and it is necessary for Beauregard to carry out the final step of the plan.

Beauregard soon understands what this means when he and Dieudonné are invited to Buckingham Palace to be officially thanked by Queen Victoria for their role in catching the Ripper. Inside the palace, the two lovers confront Count Dracula, holding the turned Victoria as a prisoner. Knowing that neither of them can defeat Dracula in direct combat, Beauregard slips Seward's silver scalpel to Victoria, allowing her to kill herself, thus depriving Dracula of his status as Prince Consort and his legal authority over Great Britain. Before the vampires can retaliate, a riot breaks loose outside the Palace – possibly orchestrated by the Club - and spills inside, allowing Beauregard and Dieudonné to escape and forcing Dracula to flee the country.

Characters

Newman incorporated numerous figures from popular fiction (due to the historical period, many are from works in the public domain).

Main characters

Minor characters 
The following characters are only mentioned, or appear only briefly in the novel.

From literature

From film or television

Historical people mentioned or appearing as characters

 Frederick Abberline
 Edward Aveling
 Barbara of Celje (here said to be one of the three Brides of Dracula)
 Elizabeth Báthory (her description is strongly suggestive of the 1971 German-Belgian horror film, Daughters of Darkness)
 Annie Besant
 Billy the Kid
 Alessandro Cagliostro
 Antoine Augustin Calmet
 Lewis Carroll
 Catherine II of Russia
 Count of St. Germain (however, the idea that he was a vampire comes from Hotel Transylvania and its sequels by Chelsea Quinn Yarbro)
 Annie Chapman
 Marie Corelli
 Montague Druitt
 Catherine Eddowes
 Edward VII
 Robert Cunninghame-Graham
 W. S. Gilbert
 Frank Harris
 John Henry "Doc" Holliday
 Henry Hyndman
 Mary Jane Kelly
 Eleanor Marx
 Henry Matthews
 Joseph Merrick
 William Morris
 Arthur Morrison
 Mary Ann Nichols
 Beatrice Potter
 George Bernard Shaw
 Emma Elizabeth Smith
 William Thomas Stead
 Bram Stoker
 Florence Stoker
 Elizabeth Stride
 Arthur Sullivan
 Algernon Charles Swinburne
 Martha Tabram
 Alfred Tennyson
 Arnold Toynbee
 Vlad Tepeş* (here said to be the same person as Dracula)
 Queen Victoria*
 Charles Warren
 Theodore Watts-Dunton
 James McNeill Whistler
 Oscar Wilde*

Critical reception
From the book cover: "The most comprehensive, brilliant, dazzlingly audacious vampire novel to date." (Locus); "A tour de fource which succeeds brilliantly." (The Times); "A marvellous marriage of political satire, melodramatic intrigue, gothic horror, and alternative history." (The Independent).

Fiction set in 1888
1992 fantasy novels
1992 British novels
British alternative history novels
British steampunk novels
Crossover novels
Dracula novels
British horror novels
Invasion literature
Novels about Jack the Ripper
Novels by Kim Newman
Vampire novels
Polygamy in fiction
Wold Newton family
Cultural depictions of Elizabeth Báthory
Cultural depictions of Billy the Kid
Cultural depictions of Catherine the Great
Cultural depictions of Joseph Merrick
Cultural depictions of George Bernard Shaw
Bram Stoker
Alfred, Lord Tennyson
Cultural depictions of Queen Victoria
Cultural depictions of Vlad the Impaler
Cultural depictions of Orson Welles
Cultural depictions of James Abbott McNeill Whistler
Cultural depictions of Oscar Wilde
Cultural depictions of Alessandro Cagliostro
Simon & Schuster books